Cintaroa aptera is a species of beetle in the family Carabidae, the only species in the genus Cintaroa.

References

Panagaeinae